Carlos Mendoza may refer to:

 Carlos Mendoza (outfielder) (born 1974), Venezuelan baseball player
 Carlos Mendoza (baseball coach) (born 1979), Venezuelan baseball player and coach
 Carlos Mendoza (footballer) (born 1992), Bolivian footballer
 Carlos Antonio Mendoza (1856–1916), Panamanian politician
 Carlos Cruz Mendoza (born 1960), Mexican politician
 Carlos Eduardo Mendoza (born 1970), United States District Judge
 Carlos Rosales Mendoza (1963–2015), Mexican drug lord
 Carlos Soriano Mendoza (born 1973), Mexican wrestler